Coagh is a small village in County Tyrone, Northern Ireland, five miles (8 km) east of Cookstown. Part of the village also extends into County Londonderry. It had a population of 545 people in the 2001 Census. It owes its existence to George Butle Conyngham of Springhill, and was founded in 1728 when King George II of Great Britain granted Conyngham a market charter allowing the village to host four fairs yearly. It is situated within Mid-Ulster District.

The village nestles among gentle, low-lying land between the Sperrins and Lough Neagh. The main feature of the village is Hanover Square, which was named after the reigning Hanoverian George II by Conyngham.  The village has been an ancient settlement for several thousand years; overlooking Coagh is Tamlaght Stone, a Mesolithic dolmen erected c. 4500 BCE.

History

The Troubles

On 3 June 1991, Provisional Irish Republican Army (IRA) volunteers  Lawrence McNally, Peter Ryan and Tony Doris were killed in an ambush by an SAS unit. The British Army stated that the IRA members had been intercepted on their way to an attack. Over 200 rounds were fired at the car.

Education
Coagh has its own primary school, Coagh Primary School, a feeder school for many local schools including Cookstown High School.

Sport 
Coagh United Football Club, which plays in the IFA Championship

Amenities 
Coagh has a surgery which serves local areas, such as Ardboe, Ballinderry, Moortown, Drummullan, The Loup and Moneymore.

Demography

19th century population
The population of the village increased slightly overall during the 19th century:

21st century population
Coagh is classified as a small village or hamlet by the NI Statistics and Research Agency (NISRA) (i.e. with population between 500 and 1,000 people). On Census day (29 April 2001) there were 545 people living in Coagh. Of these:
20.9% were aged under 16 and 20.4% were aged 60 and over
48.3% of the population were male and 51.7% were female
26.4% were from a Catholic background and 72.8% were from a Protestant background
2.3% of people aged 16–74 were unemployed.

For more details see: NI Neighbourhood Information Service

Coagh Townland
The townland is situated in the historic barony of Dungannon Upper and the civil parish of Tamlaght and covers an area of 616 acres.

The population of the townland declined during the 19th century:

In 1891, the town of Coagh, standing in the townlands of Coagh and Urbal, covered an estimated area of 13 acres.

Notable people
 Jimmy Kennedy, Tin Pan Alley composer, grew up here.
Stuart Dallas (born 1991), Northern Ireland international footballer, grew up in Coagh, having been born in Cookstown.

See also 

List of villages in Northern Ireland
List of towns in Northern Ireland
List of townlands of County Tyrone

References 
NI Conflict Archive on the Internet

Villages in County Tyrone
Villages in County Londonderry
Townlands of County Tyrone
Barony of Dungannon Upper
Mid-Ulster District